Pholcus ancoralis is a species of spider of the genus Pholcus native to various island groups in the Pacific Ocean including the Ryukyu Islands of Japan, Hawaii, New Caledonia, French Polynesia, the Samoas, Marquesas and Cook Islands.

See also 
 List of Pholcidae species

References

Pholcidae
Spiders described in 1865